Quam's Money is a 2020 Nigerian action comedy film written by Chinaza Onuzo, and directed by Kayode Kasum. The film stars Falz, Toni Tones, Jemima Osunde, Blossom Chukwujekwu and Nse Ikpe-Etim in the lead roles. It was a sequel to the 2018 film New Money. The film had its premiere in four different locations in Nigeria including the FilmHouse Cinemas in Lagos on 6 December 2020 ahead of the theatrical release. It had its theatrical release on 11 December 2020 and opened to mixed reviews from critics while also emerged as a box office success. Prior to its release, it was considered one of the most anticipated Nigerian films of 2020.

Cast 

 Falz as Quam Omole
 Toni Tones
 Jemima Osunde
 Blossom Chukwujekwu
 Nse Ikpe-Etim
 Williams Uchemba
 Buchi Ojeh
 Karibi Fubara
 Michelle Dede

Synopsis 
Quam Omole (Falz), a security guard turned millionaire whose life is thrown into chaotic nightmare sequences after he loses ₦500 million to a gang of fraudsters which he ended up handing over to the police after different chaos and trouble he went through from them.

Production 
The film was jointly produced by Inkblot Productions, FilmOne Productions and House 21 and also marked maiden production venture for House 21. It also marked the eight collaboration between Inkblot Productions and FilmOne Productions. Falz who also featured in the prequel film New Money was roped into reprise his role as Quam in the sequel film.

Awards and nominations

References

External links 

 

2020 action comedy films
2020s English-language films
English-language Nigerian films
Nigerian action comedy films
Nigerian sequel films
Films directed by Kayode Kasum